Jaromierki  is a settlement in the administrative district of Gmina Barlinek, within Myślibórz County, West Pomeranian Voivodeship, in north-western Poland.

See also
History of Pomerania.

References

Jaromierki